Lee Yun-eui (born 25 July 1987) is a South Korean footballer who plays as a defender for Bucheon FC in the K League.

External links 

1987 births
Living people
Association football defenders
South Korean footballers
Gangwon FC players
Gimcheon Sangmu FC players
Bucheon FC 1995 players
K League 1 players
K League 2 players